The Cemetery of the Resurrection is a Catholic cemetery on the southern shore of Staten Island, in New York City.

Notable burials 
 Joseph Armone (1917–1992), organized crime figure
 William Cutolo, Sr. (1949–1999), Underboss of the Colombo Crime Family
 Dorothy Day (1897–1980), Catholic social activist recognized as a Servant of God
 Costabile Farace (1960–1989), American criminal, mobster 
 Angela "Big Ang" Raiola (1960–2016), main cast on VH1 series, Mob Wives
 Anthony Spero (1929–2008), Consigliere of the Bonanno family

References

External links
 
 

Roman Catholic cemeteries in New York (state)
Cemeteries in Staten Island
Roman Catholic Archdiocese of New York